Pica Peak is a  summit located in the Methow Mountains, a subset of the North Cascades, on the shared border between Okanogan County and Chelan County in Washington state. The nearest higher neighbor is Copper Benchmark,  to the southeast, and Blue Lake Peak is set  to the west-northwest. Although modest in prominence, relief is significant as the peak rises 2,000 feet above Early Winters Basin in only . Precipitation runoff on the north side of the mountain drains to the Methow River via Early Winters Creek, whereas the south side of the mountain drains into tributaries of the Stehekin River.

Climate

Most weather fronts originate in the Pacific Ocean, and travel northeast toward the Cascade Mountains. As fronts approach the North Cascades, they are forced upward by the peaks of the Cascade Range (Orographic lift), causing them to drop their moisture in the form of rain or snowfall onto the Cascades. As a result, the west side of the North Cascades experiences high precipitation, especially during the winter months in the form of snowfall. During winter months, weather is usually cloudy, but, due to high pressure systems over the Pacific Ocean that intensify during summer months, there is often little or no cloud cover during the summer. The months July through September offer the most favorable weather for viewing or climbing this peak.

Geology

The North Cascades feature some of the most rugged topography in the Cascade Range with craggy peaks, ridges, and deep glacial valleys. Geological events occurring many years ago created the diverse topography and drastic elevation changes over the Cascade Range leading to the various climate differences. The history of the formation of the Cascade Mountains dates back millions of years ago to the late Eocene Epoch. With the North American Plate overriding the Pacific Plate, episodes of volcanic igneous activity persisted. In addition, small fragments of the oceanic and continental lithosphere called terranes created the North Cascades about 50 million years ago.

During the Pleistocene period dating back over two million years ago, glaciation advancing and retreating repeatedly scoured the landscape leaving deposits of rock debris. The "U"-shaped cross section of the river valleys are a result of recent glaciation. Uplift and faulting in combination with glaciation have been the dominant processes which have created the tall peaks and deep valleys of the North Cascades area.

See also
 Geography of the North Cascades

Gallery

References

External links
Pica Peak weather: National Weather Service Forecast

North Cascades
Mountains of Washington (state)
Mountains of Okanogan County, Washington
Mountains of Chelan County, Washington
North Cascades of Washington (state)
Cascade Range
North American 2000 m summits